Gustavus Hamilton Blenkinsopp Coulson,  (1 April 1879 – 18 May 1901) was a British Army officer and an English recipient of the Victoria Cross, the highest decoration for gallantry "in the face of the enemy" awarded to members of the British and Commonwealth armed forces.

Early life
Coulson was born on 1 April 1879 in Wimbledon, London, and educated at Winchester College.

Military career
Coulson was 22 years old, and a lieutenant and Adjutant in the 1st Battalion, The King's Own Scottish Borderers, British Army during the Second Boer War when the following deed took place on 18 May 1901 at Lambrechtfontein, South Africa, for which he was posthumously awarded the VC:

There is a memorial to Coulson in St Peter's Church, Tiverton, Devon, and his Victoria Cross is displayed at the Regimental Museum of The Kings Own Scottish Borderers, Berwick upon Tweed, Northumberland.

Notes

References
 Profile

1879 births
1901 deaths
Second Boer War recipients of the Victoria Cross
British military personnel killed in the Second Boer War
British recipients of the Victoria Cross
King's Own Scottish Borderers officers
British Army personnel of the Second Boer War
People from Wimbledon, London
Companions of the Distinguished Service Order
Green Howards officers
British Army recipients of the Victoria Cross
People educated at Winchester College